Laestadianism, also known as Laestadian Lutheranism and Apostolic Lutheranism,  is a pietistic Lutheran revival movement started in Sápmi in the middle of the 19th century. Named after Swedish Lutheran state church administrator and temperance movement leader Lars Levi Laestadius, it is the biggest pietistic revivalist movement in the Nordic countries. It has members mainly in Finland, Northern America, Norway, Russia and Sweden. There are also smaller congregations in Africa, South America and Central Europe. In addition Laestadian Lutherans have missionaries in 23 countries. The number of Laestadians worldwide is estimated to be between 144,000 and 219,000.

Organization in Finland and North America 

Most Laestadians in Finland are part of the national Lutheran Church of Finland (cf. Communion of Nordic Lutheran Dioceses), but in America, where there is no official Lutheran church, they founded their own denomination, which split into several sub-groups in the mid-20th century.  Because of doctrinal opinion differences and personality conflicts, the movement split into 19 branches, of which about 15 are active today. The three large main branches are Conservative Laestadianism (corresponds to the Laestadian Lutheran Church, in North America known to other Laestadians as the "Heidemans" after 20th-century leader Paul A. Heideman); the Firstborn (in North America, "Old Apostolic Lutheran Church" ("Esikoinens" to other Laestadian denominations); and Rauhan Sana ("Word of Peace"), known in USA and Canada as the Apostolic Lutheran Church of America (to other Laestadians, the "Mickelsens" after 20th-century leader Reverend Andrew Mickelsen (1897–1983).  These comprise about 90 percent of Laestadians.  Other branches are small and some of them inactive.

In Finland, the Elämän Sana ("the Word of life") group, as the most "mainline" of the different branches of Laestadianism, has been prominent within the hierarchy of the Evangelical Lutheran Church of Finland: two members have been elected bishops of Oulu, and one has served as Chaplain General (head chaplain of the Finnish Defence Forces, the equivalent of a Major General).

Distinguishing doctrines and practices

Emphasis on justification 
All branches share many essential teachings including a central emphasis on the Lutheran doctrine of justification (forgiveness and grace).

The true Christians doctrine 
Another core teaching concerns essential differences in lifestyle and beliefs between true believers on one hand, and false Christians (sometimes distinguished as living faith versus dead faith) and unbelievers on the other.

Exclusion and inclusion among Laestadian sub-groups
The leaders of the two largest Laestadian sub-groups, the Conservative Laestadians and Firstborn Laestadians, have for decades excluded each other and all other Laestadian sub-groups from the kingdom of Heaven even though the denominations' core doctrines are nearly indistinguishable. The leadership of the smaller third main sub-group, the Federation, has continued to regard the other sub-groups as of living faith, after having unsuccessfully sought to preserve unity within Laestadianism when its larger counterparts' leaders in the 1930s called for, and later required, dissociation from the Federation and other Laestadian denominations.

Declaration of forgiveness 
The church teaches that every believer has the authority to testify that others' sins are forgiven, sometimes referred to as the audible declaration of the forgiveness of sins. Laestadians usually proclaim the forgiveness of sins "in Jesus' name and blood".

In practice 
Laestadianism holds that when a Christian has committed a sin, whether in thought or deed, she or he should confess the sin to another believer.  Thus it is a common practice among Laestadians in or out of church at any time, but especially during the church service prior to the rite of holy communion, to be confessing their sins to one another or, occasionally, to one of the church ministers performing the sacrament.  A common declaration is, "Believe your sin(s) forgiven in Jesus' name and (shed) blood."  This procedure, ingrained in Laestadianism, differs from absolution in mainstream Lutheran churches in several aspects, including that the request for forgiveness need not be, and most often is not, to the minister; the confession is often made openly; confession is not by appointment but rather readily available to any believer from any other believer at any time; and the specific wording of the declaration states that the means of atonement is Christ's shed blood.

A most solemn rite 
Because a Laestadian takes very seriously the proposition that grace exists only for one whose sins have been specifically forgiven, there is scarcely another rite in this movement that would rival the importance of the declaration of forgiveness.  This doctrine is a unique extension of the priesthood of the believer doctrine.

Identifying greeting and farewell 
When greeting each other, Laestadians say "God's greetings" in English (or in Finnish: , meaning 'God's greeting' or 'welcome'). To take their leave of each other, they say "God's peace" in English.

Emphasis on avoiding sin and "worldliness" 
"Worldliness" is discouraged, and Laestadians frown on pre-marital sex and on alcohol consumption except in the sacrament of holy communion. Conservative Laestadians frown upon worldly vices such as dancing, television, birth control, rhythmic music, make-up, earrings, movies, tattoos, and cursing. Some conservative elements within the church go even further in rejecting the ways of the world, for examples, refusing to buy insurance, prohibiting their children's participation in organized school sports, and removing their car radios. Simplicity in the home, including the prohibition of curtains and flowers, is also a common claim - especially among Firstborn Laestadians - but not a Church doctrine.

Birth control 
Especially large numbers of Firstborn Apostolic Lutherans and many members of the most conservative congregations within the Word of Peace group, for examples, do not use birth control because they believe that a child is a gift from God; therefore, many Laestadian families are large.

Social gatherings 
The central activities of Laestadians are annual or more frequent church conventions, including the Summer Services of Conservative Laestadians, attended by members from congregations far and wide; and for the youth, haps (gatherings of teenagers and young adults to sing from Songs and Hymns of Zion and visit), song services, bonfires, youth discussions, caretaking meetings and revival meetings.

Within Firstborn Laestadianism in Scandinavia, the most important yearly events are the Christmas services in Gällivare and the Midsummer services in Lahti, where thousands of Firstborn Laestadians gather each year from different countries.

Publications 
Different branches publish their newspapers and magazines.

Chosen Scripture 
In Finland, the Bible version primarily used by Laestadians is the Finnish Bible of 1776 which, unlike newer translations, is based on the Textus Receptus. The Central Association of the Finnish Associations of Peace (SRK) publishes a triple Finnish translation (1776, 1933/1938, and 1992) that is used as both a study and a service Bible by Conservative Laestadian preachers. American and Canadian Laestadianism uses the King James Version, based as well on the Textus Receptus.

History

Roots of the movement 

The name of the movement stems from Lars Levi Laestadius (1800–1861), a Swedish Sámi preacher and administrator for the Swedish state Lutheran church in Sápmi who was also a noted botanist.  Laestadius started the movement when working as a pastor for the Church of Sweden in northern Sweden in the 1840s. Laestadius met a Sami woman named Milla Clementsdotter from Föllinge in the municipality of Krokom in Jämtland during an 1844 inspection tour of Åsele. She belonged to a revival movement within the Church of Sweden led by pastor Pehr Brandell of the parish of Nora in the municipality of Kramfors in Ångermanland and characterized by pietistic and Moravian influences. She told Laestadius about her spiritual experiences on her journey to a truly living Christianity, and after the meeting Laestadius felt he had come to understand the secret of living faith. He had had a deep experience of having entered a state of grace, of having received God's forgiveness for his sins and of at last truly seeing the path that leads to eternal life. His sermons acquired, in his own words, "a new kind of colour" to which people began to respond.  The movement began to spread from Sweden to Finland and Norway, particularly among the Sámi and the Kvens.  He preferred his followers to be known simply as "Christians", but others started to call them "Laestadians."

Initial effect on Laestadius's Sámi parishioners 
Two great challenges Laestadius had faced since his early days as a church minister were the indifference of his Sámi parishioners, who had been forced by the Swedish government to convert from their shamanistic religion to Lutheranism, and the misery caused them by alcoholism.  The spiritual understanding Laestadius acquired and shared in his new sermons "filled with vivid metaphors from the lives of the Sami that they could understand, ... about a God who cared about the lives of the people" had a profound positive effect on both problems.  An account from the Sámi cultural perspective recalls a new desire among the Sámi to learn to read and a bustle and energy in the church, with people confessing their sins, crying and praying for forgiveness—within Laestadianism this was known as liikutukset, a kind of ecstasy.  Drunkenness and cattle theft diminished, which had a positive influence on the Samis’ relationships, finances and family life.

Rise of Laestadianism among the Sámi 
The rapid rise of Laestadianism among the Sámi was due to several factors. Laestadius proudly self-identified as Sámi through his Southern Sámi mother.  He spoke and preached in two Sámi dialects.  Further he chose uneducated lay preachers from the Sámi reindeer herders to travel year around with them and preach to the unrepented among them.  Additionally, in the early days of the movement, Laestadius, in order to find common ground with his parishioners, borrowed the Sámis’ own familiar pagan deities and concepts and adapted them to Christianity.  Another factor in the rise of Laestadianism among the Sámi was that the state-mandated boarding schools soon came to be populated by Laestadian personnel.  Next, the strict moral code including strict temperance of Laestadianism appealed to the Sámi.  Whole communities that had been wrecked by alcoholism went sober virtually overnight.  This had the added positive effect of improving the Sámis' social standing with the outside world.  Finally, Laestadianism was a faith that the Sámi could identify as originating from within inasmuch as Laestadius himself professed to have come to know the true living faith only upon his encounter with the poor abused Sámi woman, Milla Clementsdotter.

"Unbroken line of living Christianity" 
A faction within Laestadianism has believed that the movement is a contemporary descendant of an unbroken line of living Christianity via the Luther, the Bohemian Brethren, the Lollards, and the Waldensians all the way back to the primitive Church. Martin Luther, Jan Hus, John Wycliffe and Peter Waldo are seen as spiritual ancestors of Laestadianism.

Demographics

Groups in 2012 
 1. Conservative Laestadianism 115 000 people (in Finland (SRK), U.S.A. (Laestadian Lutheran Church), Sweden (SFC), Russia, Togo (ELLT), Canada (LLC), Kenya (LLOP), Ghana (LLC), Gambia (LLC), Ecuador, Norway, Estonia (ELR), Latvia, London, Germany, Hungary, Spain, Switzerland, Turkey, etc.)
 2. Firstborn Laestadianism unknown membership number (in U.S.A. (Old Apostolic Lutheran Church), Finland (Esikoislestadiolaiset ry), Sweden, Norway, Russia, Latvia)
 3. Little Firstborn group (Rauhan Sana group) 21 000 people (in Finland (LFF and LYRS), U.S.A. (Apostolic Lutheran Church of America), Sweden, Norway, Canada (ALC), Guatemala, Nigeria, India, Togo(ALC) and Kenya)
 4. Torola group 4 000 people (in U.S.A.(First Apostolic Lutheran Church), Sweden and Finland (SVR))
 5. Reed group (Pollarites) 3,500 people in U.S.A. (Independent Apostolic Lutheran Church)
 6. Reawakening 3 000 people (in Finland (LLK) and Norway)
 7. Old Erikians (Lyngen group) 1 200 people in Norway 
 8. New Erikians 800 people in Norway
 9. Aunes group 550 people in U.S.A. (The Apostolic Lutheran Church)
 10. Elämän Sana group (clericalists) 300 people (in Finland, Sweden (SFK) and Norway)
 11. Levi group 200 people (in Finland and Sweden)
 12. GALC 50 people in U.S.A. (Grace Apostolic Lutheran Church)
 13. Leskinen group 50 people (in Sweden and Norway)
 14. Kvaenangen group (svärmeri) 50 people in Norway
 15. Davidites 40 people in U.S.A.
 16. Gundersen group 30 people in Norway
 17. Hanka group (Melvinites) 20 people in U.S.A.
 18. Sten group 15 people in Finland
 19. Kontio group 5 people in Finland

Fertility 
Members tend to have large families by Western standards. In Finland, their demographic advantage has grown as the national fertility rate has fallen: in the 1940s their fertility rate was twice the national average, while in the 1980s it was four times the average. "By 1985–7, the Laestadian and Finnish TFRs stood at 5.47 and 1.45 respectively. Even within the Laestadian TFR of 5.47, there is diversity, with a 'moderate' group preferring to stop at four [children] and practise birth control while a conservative cluster engages in unrestrained reproduction. 

No research has been done on Laestadians' level of endogamy and membership retention [as of 2010]. However, they are residentially and occupationally integrated, so lose more members to assimilation." For example, in the small town of Larsmo, despite some losses to outmarriage and emigration, their share of the population doubled over just thirty years to about 40% in 1991 and was predicted to be "a two-thirds majority of the town in a generation."

In popular culture

In literature 
An Examination of the Pearl, a book written by Edwin A. Suominen. An Examination of the Pearl is a study of the doctrine and history of Conservative Laestadianism. The book also looks at the teachings of Martin Luther, early Christianity, Christian fundamentalism and sectarianism, and the Bible.
To Cook A Bear by Mikael Niemi. A fictional tale set in the far north of Sweden in 1852 following a runaway Sami boy and his mentor, the famous pastor Laestadius.
Lars Levi Laestadius and the Sami
Læstadianism and Its Role in the Loss of the Traditional Sámi Worldview, by Viktor 'Vulle' Cornell
Laestadianism
Lars Levi Laestadius and the Revival in Lapland, by Warren H. Hepokoski
The Laestadian Movement: Background Writings and Testimonies, compiled by Warren H. Hepokoski 
The Laestadian Movement: Disputes and Divisions 1861 – 2000, by Warren H. Hepokoski
We Sinners, a novel about Laestadianism by former LLC-member Hanna Pylväinen. 
 Science Fiction author Walter Jon Williams discusses his family history with Laestadianism

In film 
All the Sins - a Finnish TV series set in a Laestadian town in northern Finland
Laestadianism – USA (short documentary)
Forbidden Fruit 
The Kautokeino Rebellion
The Earth Is a Sinful Song
Elina: As If I Wasn't There
Arctic Circle (Finnish: Ivalo) – TV Series
Bordertown (Finnish TV series), season 3, episodes 7 & 8, features mysterious deaths in a Conservative Laestadian community.

Famous Laestadians 
In addition to the founder Laestadius himself, who was also a noted botanist, and chronicler of the Samis' shamanistic religious beliefs, former prime minister of Finland and leader for seven years of the Finnish Centre Party, Juha Sipilä, is a life-long Laestadian of the Rauhan Sana group.

See also 

Conservative Laestadianism
Firstborn Laestadianism
Kautokeino rebellion
Korpela movement
Laestadianism in America
Apostolic Lutheran Church of America
Laestadian Lutheran Church
Summer Services
Läsare, a related Swedish movement
 Hans Nielsen Hauge, a non-Laestadian figure in the Awakening revival in Norway whose writings are studied by some Laestadians today.
 Ushkovayzet are Eastern Orthodox Laestadians (article is in Russian).

Sources

Notes

External links 

 NPR, Faith, Family And Forgiveness In 'We Sinners' a novel by Hanna Pylvainen
Warren H. Hepokoski, Preachers writings and letters
Lestadiolaisuus.info: Pictures about American Laestadianism
Lestadiolaisuus.info: Newspaper articles about Laestadianism in America

 
Lutheranism in Finland
History of Lutheranism in Sweden
Lutheran revivals
Lutheran denominations